Carrara is a surname. Notable people with the surname include:

Benoît Carrara (born 1926), skier
Giovanni Carrara (born 1968), baseballer
Matteo Carrara (born 1979), rider
Michela Carrara (born 1997), biathlete
Pieralberto Carrara (born 1966), biathlete and Olympic medallist
Sandro Carrara, Swiss engineer

See also
Leslie Carrara-Rudolph, puppeteer

Italian-language surnames